Birkebeineren Ski Stadium is a cross-country skiing and biathlon venue located in Lillehammer, Norway. The former has a capacity for 31,000 spectators, and the latter for 13,500. The venue was built for the 1994 Winter Olympics, costing 83.6 million Norwegian krone (NOK). It was subsequently used by the 1994 Winter Paralympics for Paralympic Nordic skiing and Paralympic biathlon. After the games, ownership was transferred to the municipal Lillehammer Olympiapark. The venue has since been used for one Biathlon World Cup, three FIS Cross-Country World Cup and nine FIS Nordic Combined World Cup tournaments, the latter with the ski jumping competition taking place at the nearby Lysgårdsbakkene Ski Jumping Arena. Birkebeineren hosted the 2016 Winter Youth Olympics.

Construction
The location of the venue was decided in January 1990, following Lillehammer's successful bid to host the 1994 Winter Olympics. Construction was managed by the Lillehammer Olympic Organizing Committee (LOOC). Architects were 2Ø Arkitekter and the main consultant was Tonning & Lieng. Construction started in early 1991, before planning was completed, and lasted until 1993. The construction work was subcontracted to several companies. Landscaping was completed in 1994. The facilities used concrete and wood as the main materials. The stadium included  of temporary buildings, a  building converted to a riding center after the Olympics, and a  tent. The land around the venue is a swamp, and most of the surface soil had to be removed and replaced with harder earth. The soil was used as fertilizer or fill in other parts of the arena. The arena is also so flat that a drainage system had to be installed. After the Olympics, four temporary overpasses were removed. Construction of the tracks was done to minimize the impact on the forest.

The venue cost NOK 83.6 million, and was inaugurated on 28 November 1992 with an international biathlon competition. In December 1992, the LOOC stated that they wanted to upgrade the stadium spectator capacity, but that the transport systems would not allow more people. In 1993, the stadium had World Cup tournaments in biathlon and cross-country skiing as a trial before the Olympics. During several events, the computer system controlling the scoreboard and television scores collapsed. President Johan Baumann of the Norwegian Ski Federation criticized the venue and demanded that a new stadium be built. He stated that the stadium had been built to optimize television pictures, and that it had insufficient facilities for the spectators. In particular, he criticized the fact that the spectators were too far away from the skiers and the lack of a television screen and more scoreboards. In May, the LOOC announced that the stadium would be expanded for another 6,000 people before the Olympics. On 7 September, the ownership of the venue was transferred from the LOOC to Lillehammer Municipality via the subsidiary Lillehammer Olympiavekst, which later changed its name to Lillehammer Olympiapark. In October, the forest along the tracks were partially cleared to allow spectators without tickets to watch the events.

Facilities
There are two stadiums, one for cross-country skiing and one for biathlon. The former has a spectator capacity for 31,000, while the latter has a capacity for 13,500. In addition, up to 75,000 people watched the events the trackside during the Olympics. Permanent buildings include a  finishing house for biathlon, a  finishing house for cross-country, a  plant room. The biathlon stadium has 30 shooting stations. The facility has a 1,250 kVA transformer, with an additional transformer used during the Olympics. Critical systems, such as computers and time-keeping equipment, have an uninterruptible power supply.

During the summer, the tracks are available for jogging, running, roller skiing and similar activities. There is a café between the two stadiums, which also have dressing rooms and showers. The biathlon venue can be rented to hold private biathlon competition, with or without skis.

The dominant means of transport during the Olympics was by railway. Spectators heading to Birkebeineren were transported by train to Hovemoen Station on the Dovre Line, and would then be transported by shuttle bus to the stadium. In addition, spectators from certain areas were transported by bus directly to the stadium.

Events

During the 1994 Winter Olympics, the venue hosted ten cross-country skiing events, six biathlon events and two Nordic combined events. Over 203,000 people applied for the 31,000 seats for the relay. During the 1994 Winter Paralympics, the venue hosted the Paralympic Nordic skiing events and Paralympic biathlon.

The FIS Cross-Country World Cup has been hosted three times, in 1993, 2000 and 2002, all in February or March. The FIS Nordic Combined World Cup has been hosted seven times at the stadium, in 1998, 2000, 2003, 2005, 2006, 2009 and 2010. All tournaments have been held in December, and have seen the ski jumping competition hosted at Lysgårdsbakken, the Olympic ski jumping hill in Lillehammer. Birkebeineren hosted Biathlon World Cup events from 1993 to 1997. The stadium has also since 1992 been used as the goal area for Birkebeinerrennet, an annual ski marathon with thousands of participants. It has also hosted the Norwegian Nordic Ski Championships in 1993. Lillehammer hosted the 2016 Winter Youth Olympics; the cross-country, Nordic combined and biathlon events took place at Birkebeineren.

Results
The following is a list of all Winter Olympics and World Cup events to be held at the stadium. It includes date, sport (cross-country skiing, Nordic combined or biathlon), tournament, distance, and top three athletes (gold, silver and bronze).

References

Bibliography
 
 
 

Venues of the 1994 Winter Olympics
Venues of the 2016 Winter Youth Olympics
Olympic biathlon venues
Olympic cross-country skiing venues
Olympic Nordic combined venues
Ski stadiums in Norway
Sports venues in Lillehammer
1992 establishments in Norway